Applied Scholastics is a non-profit corporation founded in 1972 to promote the use of study techniques created by L. Ron Hubbard, the founder of the Church of Scientology.  Hubbard called his theories on learning and education "study technology". Applied Scholastics runs the "Hollywood Education and Literacy Project" (HELP), the World Literacy Crusade, "Education Alive", and the "Literacy, Education and Abilities Program" (LEAP).

Applied Scholastics' declared mission is: "to promote and develop programs of effective education for educators, business trainers, tutors, parents, children and people in all walks of life who need improved study skills to enhance their scholastic, business and personal activities."

Applied Scholastics is sponsored by the Church of Scientology.

Study Tech

Study Tech is a teaching methodology developed by L. Ron Hubbard.

Hubbard's theories on education describe three "barriers to learning". The first is the absence of mass, pertaining to the lack of a physical object relating to a concept. The second is a steep study "gradient", meaning a necessary previous step was skipped to master a skill. The third is the "misunderstood word", which necessitates looking up unclear words in the dictionary.

Students are taught that "misunderstood words" are a major cause of confusion and misunderstanding. They are taught to use dictionaries extensively. Emphasis is also put on making sure children are taught at a "gradient", so that a subject's crucial elementary concepts come before more difficult concepts. "Mass" is described as a measure of mental tangibility that students ascribe to a subject, so that students have a picture in their mind of the thing they are learning about.

Applied Scholastics licenses Study Tech to a number of schools throughout the world. In return, these schools pay 4% of their gross income to Applied Scholastics.

Criticism and controversy
In 1992, Applied Materials settled a lawsuit for an estimated $600,000. The lawsuit claimed that the three former employees who filed the lawsuit had been driven out of the company because they had complained about the seminars Applied Scholastics had been contracted to teach there. Applied Scholastics said regarding the case, "In ten years of business, we've never had anything come up like this."

In 1998, the group submitted five of its books for approval as supplemental classroom texts to the California Department of Education. The review board found no religious content to object to, although they did object to the lack of portrayals of disabled persons and people of color. The Southern California American Civil Liberties Union, however, objected on the basis that the books used many of the terms and concepts that the Church of Scientology uses elsewhere in its Study Tech.

In the aftermath of Hurricane Katrina, Applied Scholastics convinced the principal of Prescott Middle School in Baton Rouge, Louisiana to implement a program of Study Tech. Critics worried that the move was "an insidious plan ultimately aimed at promoting Scientology." However, Prescott's principal and two education experts claimed that they "saw [no] hidden Scientology agenda or proselytizing in the text." The school's principal felt that the program was worthwhile. In October 2005, St. Louis Public Schools superintendent Creg Williams discovered the group's Scientology connections and immediately advised area principals to cease working with Applied Scholastics. Additionally, CEO Bennetta Slaughter falsely claimed a "partnership" with the Hazelwood School District in St. Louis.

Some parents were upset when Applied Scholastics methods were introduced in September 2008 at Bambolino Montessori Academy, a private school in Toronto. The owner/principal and dean of the school are both Scientologists but they say that Applied Scholastics is secular and that they do not teach Scientology.

In 2013, a charter school group in Phoenix, Arizona came under criticism for using tools provided by Applied Scholastics.

See also
Delphi Schools
Greenfields School
Progressive Academy
World Literacy Crusade

References

Further reading

External links

 

1972 establishments in the United States
Non-profit organizations based in Missouri
Religious education
Religious organizations established in 1972
Scientology organizations

Pseudoscience